Albany Regional Prison is a maximum security prison located 8 km West of Albany, Western Australia. Albany Prison was commissioned in 1966 with a capacity of 72 minimum security cells. In 1979 it was upgraded to maximum security and in 1988 expanded to a capacity of 126. In 1993 it expanded again, to 186 standard-bed cells and by 2013 to 310.

Albany Prison is the only maximum-security prison outside Perth and manages maximum, medium and minimum-security prisoners and holds a significant number of long-term prisoners originally from other countries.

Since 1996 Albany prison has been responsible for administering the nearby the Pardelup and Walpole work camps.

The prisoners are able to study full-time in various subjects or work in one of the various workshops that are part of the prison.

A prison officer, Anthony Daniels, was stabbed four times during an escape attempt by two prisoners in 1994. Officer Daniels received a Prison Service Bravery Award in 2000.

On 29 December 2010, minimum security inmate Shane Gibbs escaped by driving off in a utility vehicle.

Less than ten prisoners were involved in a riot in September 2018 that caused damage to cells, lights, windows and a security grille. The riot was quelled in less than two hours and was caused by the rejection of an application of two prisoners to relocate to a prison in Perth.

References

1966 establishments in Australia
Prisons in Western Australia
Maximum security prisons in Australia
Buildings and structures in Albany, Western Australia